Merotocin (INN) (developmental code name FE-202767), also known as carba-1-(4-FBzlGly7)dOT, is a peptidic agonist of the oxytocin receptor that was derived from oxytocin. It is under development by Ferring Pharmaceuticals for the treatment of preterm mothers with lactation failure requiring lactation support, and is in phase II clinical trials for this indication. Merotocin is potent (EC50 < 0.1 nM) and highly selective (>1000-fold over the related vasopressin receptors).

See also
 Carbetocin
 Demoxytocin
 TC OT 39
 WAY-267,464

References

External links
 Pipeline - Ferring Pharmaceuticals
 Merotocin - AdisInsight

Oxytocin receptor agonists
Cyclic peptides